Karl von Spiess or Spieß (20 April 1880 – 1 July 1957) was an Austrian folklorist who specialized in the study of German folklore.

Biography
Karl von Spiess was born in Vienna, Austria-Hungary on 20 April 1880. He received a Ph.D. in botany at the University of Vienna, and subsequently taught the natural sciences at a variety of gymnasiums in Vienna. Since 1925, von Spiess worked as a private scholar. At this time he was in close correspondence with Georg Hüsing and Wolfgang Schultz, with whom he discussed mythology. After the Anschluss, von Spiess became a Vienna associate of Amt Rosenberg. von Spiess was the author of numerous works on German folklore. He died in Innsbruck on 1 July 1957.

Selected works
Germanisches Erbe in der deutschen Volkskunst. In: Ernst Otto Thiele (Bearb.): Das germanische Erbe in der deutschen Volkskultur. Die Vorträge des 1. Deutschen Volkskundetages zu Braunschweig, Herbst 1938, München: Hoheneichen 1939, S. 34–56. 
Deutsche Volkskunde als Erschließerin deutscher Kultur, Stubenrauch Verlag, Berlin. First edition 1923, second edition 1943.

See also
 Edmund Mudrak

Sources

Die Berliner Universität in der NS-Zeit: Band II: Fachbereiche und Fakultäten, hrsg. v. Rüdiger vom Bruch, Franz Steiner Verlag, Stuttgart 2005, S. 139–140.

1880 births
1957 deaths
20th-century Austrian botanists
Austrian folklorists
Germanic studies scholars
People from Vienna
University of Vienna alumni